Massachusetts House of Representatives' 3rd Barnstable district in the United States is one of 160 legislative districts included in the lower house of the Massachusetts General Court. It covers part of Barnstable County. Republican David Vieira of Falmouth has represented the district since 2011.

Towns represented
The district includes the following localities:
 part of Bourne
 part of Falmouth
 Mashpee

The current district geographic boundary overlaps with those of the Massachusetts Senate's Cape and Islands and Plymouth and Barnstable districts.

Former locales
The district previously covered:
 Chatham, circa 1872 
 Orleans, circa 1872

Representatives
 Ira Mayo, circa 1858 
 Elijah Cobb, circa 1859 
 David Conwell, circa 1888 
 Jerome S. Smith, circa 1920 
 Richard E. Kendall, circa 1975 
 Thomas Cahir, circa 1998
 Nancy Caffyn, 1999–2001
 Matthew C. Patrick, 2001–2011
 David T. Vieira, 2011-current

See also
 List of Massachusetts House of Representatives elections
 Other Barnstable County districts of the Massachusetts House of Representatives: 1st, 2nd, 4th, 5th; Barnstable, Dukes and Nantucket
 List of Massachusetts General Courts
 List of former districts of the Massachusetts House of Representatives

Images

References

External links
 Ballotpedia
  (State House district information based on U.S. Census Bureau's American Community Survey).
 League of Women Voters of the Cape Cod Area
 League of Women Voters Plymouth Area

House
Government of Barnstable County, Massachusetts